Prometheus: Original Motion Picture Soundtrack is an original motion picture soundtrack album for the 2012 science fiction film, Prometheus. Written by German composer Marc Streitenfeld, the soundtrack also features two supplemental pieces by English composer Harry Gregson-Williams, and it was conducted by Ben Foster.

Development

Marc Streitenfeld is a frequent collaborator with Ridley Scott. The Prometheus project becoming the fifth collaboration between the composer and the director. The score was recorded over one week with a 90-piece orchestra at Abbey Road Studios in London, England, where it was also processed by Scott after the fact. Streitenfeld began coming up with ideas for the score after reading the script prior to the commencement of filming. To create an "unsettling" sound, he provided the orchestra with reversed music sheets to have them play segments of the score backwards, before then digitally reversing it. The track "Friend from the Past" reprises Jerry Goldsmith's original main title from the Alien soundtrack.

Release
The Prometheus soundtrack album was released on iTunes on 15 May 2012 and in audio CD on June 4 in the United Kingdom. It was released in the United States on June 12.

Track listing
All music is by Streitenfeld, with the exception of the two supplemental score tracks by Gregson-Williams as noted.

Selected credits
Choir – Apollo Voices, Bach Choir, Metro Voices 
Chorus Master [Choirmaster] – Jenny O'Grady 
Booklet editing and design – WLP Ltd 
Music Editor [London] – Kirsty Whalley 
Music Editors – Del Spiva, Joseph Bonn, MPSE 
Orchestra Leader – Everton Nelson
Solo horn - Richard Watkins 
Album mastered by Dave Collins 
Album mixed by Greg Hayes 
Music by Marc Streitenfeld (tracks: 1 to 3, 5 to 11, 13 to 25) 
Conducted and orchestrated by Ben Foster 
Music programmed by Sunna Wehrmeijer 
Score recorded and mixed by Peter Gobbin

References

2012 soundtrack albums
Alien (franchise) soundtracks